Colonsay is an island in the Inner Hebrides of Scotland, located north of Islay and south of Mull. Aligned on a south-west to north-east axis, it measures  in length and reaches  at its widest point.

Geology 
The Colonsay Group, which takes its name from the island, is an estimated  sequence of mildly metamorphosed Neoproterozoic sedimentary rocks that also outcrop on the islands of Islay and Oronsay and the surrounding seabed. The sequence has been correlated with the Grampian Group, the oldest part of the Dalradian Supergroup. It includes the metawackes of the Oronsay Greywacke Formation, the sandstones of the Dun Gallain Grit Formation, the metasandstones and metamudstones of the Machrins Arkose, Kilchattan and Milbuie formations, the sandstones and phyllites of the Kiloran Flags Formation and the phyllitic semipelites and quartzites of the Staosnaig Phyllite Formation. In the far north at the north end of Traigh Ban is an outcrop of the orthogneiss of the Palaeoproterozoic age Rhinns Complex named from the larger outcrop on nearby Islay.

Intrusive igneous rocks are represented by diorites and monzonites of the 'North Britain Siluro-Devonian Calc-Alkaline Dyke Suite' seen at Scalasaig and Balnahard. Lamprophyre dykes, assigned to the same suite are also frequently seen intruding the country rocks. Later intrusions took place during the early Palaeogene period and consists of microgabbro dykes assigned to the North Britain Palaeogene Dyke Suite. The island is cut by numerous geological faults many of which are aligned either NE-SW or ENE-WSW.

Superficial deposits consist largely of modern-day beach deposits, some raised marine deposits and blown sand. There are also areas of glacial till of Pleistocene age and of peat formed in the postglacial period.

Geography 
Although Colonsay appears bare and somewhat forbidding on approach from the sea, its landscape is varied, with several beautiful sandy beaches, and a sheltered and fertile interior, unusually well-wooded for a Hebridean island. It is linked by a tidal causeway (called The Strand) to Oronsay.

History

Mesolithic food industry
In 1995 evidence of large-scale Mesolithic nut shelling, some 8,000 years ago, was found in a midden pit at Staosnaig on the island's sheltered east coast, in a large, shallow pit full of the remains of hundreds of thousands of burned hazelnut shells. Hazelnuts have been found on other Mesolithic sites, but rarely in such quantities or concentrated in one pit. Similar sites in Britain and its dependencies are known only at Farnham in Surrey and Cass ny Hawin on the Isle of Man.

This discovery gives an insight into communal activity and forward planning of the period. The nuts were harvested in a single year and pollen analysis suggests that the hazel trees were all cut down at the same time. The scale of the activity, unparalleled elsewhere in Scotland, and the lack of large game on the island, suggests that Colonsay's inhabitants were largely vegetarian. The pit was originally on a beach close to the shore, and there were two smaller stone-lined pits, whose function remains obscure, a hearth, and a second cluster of pits.

Early history

There are a variety of ruined hill forts on the island such as Dùn Cholla and Dùn Meadhonach. The eighth century Riasg Buidhe Cross has been re-erected in the gardens of Colonsay House. St Cathan's Chapel may date from the 14th century. The ruins of the Chapel of St. Mary are little more than foundations and may date to an even earlier period. in 1549 Dean Monro wrote that Colonsay was "seven myle lange from the northeist to the southwest, with twa myle bredthe, ane fertile ile guid for quhit fishing. It hath ane paroch kirke. This ile is bruikit be ane gentle capitane, callit M’Duffyhe, and pertened of auld to Clandonald of Kyntyre."

A Viking grave at Kiloran Bay, including a boat and silver burial goods, was discovered in 1882 on land belonging to John MacNeil.

Ownership
During the 18th century the lairds of the island were McNeils and included Archibald MacNeil. Colonsay House was first built by the McNeil family in 1722.

Since 1904 the house has been the property of the island's later owners, the Barons Strathcona and Mount Royal. Colonsay was owned by Euan Howard, 4th Baron Strathcona and Mount Royal until his death in 2018 and Colonsay House is currently occupied by his elder son, Alexander Howard, 5th Baron Strathcona and Mount Royal and his family.

In 2013 the Argyll and Bute Council threatened legal action against Alexander Howard over the state of the Rubh' Aird Alanais beach following the significant removal of gravel leading to large holes. Howard infuriated island residents, by accusing them of removing gravel from a beach without permission. Locals said that innocent people had been labelled "thieves" and "peasants". It was later discovered that the gravel had been removed by a builder working on behalf of one of the crofters.

Present day
The island's population was 124 as recorded by the 2011 census an increase of nearly 15% since 2001 when there were 108 usual residents. During the same period Scottish island populations as a whole grew by 4% to 103,702.  Colonsay's main settlement is Scalasaig on the east coast.

Recently there has been a growth of tourism as the mainstay of the island's economy, with numerous holiday cottages, many of them owned and managed by the Isle of Colonsay Estate. The Colonsay Hotel, the only hotel on the island, is also estate owned.

The island has a tiny bookshop specialising in books of local interest; it is also the home of the House of Lochar publishing company specialising in Scottish history.  The hotel overlooks the harbour, and there is also a cafe and bakery, a shop and post office. Colonsay's best known beach, Kiloran Bay, is a vast stretch of golden sands and draws locals and tourists alike while maintaining an isolated and peaceful atmosphere.

Colonsay Community Development Company, the local development trust is “engaged in a range of work which reflects a sustainable approach to the regeneration of our island”. Current projects include running the islands coal supply and only petrol pump, a major Rhododendron ponticum eradication programme and a feasibility study into the possibility of improving the harbour and surrounding area.

2007 saw the opening of the Colonsay Brewery, a micro-brewery that employs two people and offers three different products. Colonsay is the smallest island in the world with its own brewery. In 2016 the brewery launched a gin, called Wild Island Botanic Gin, distilled with hand gathered wild botanicals from the island. It is distilled at Langley Distillery in a cooperation with master distiller Rob Dorset. In February 2017 a company called Wild Thyme Spirits Ltd, started by husband and wife team Finlay and Eileen Geekie who moved to Colonsay from Oxfordshire in 2016, brought out a product called Colonsay Gin which is believed to be distilled at Strathearn Distillery in Perthshire.

The nature of island life was exemplified by a story reported in 1993 that, at that time, the last recorded crime was treachery against the King in 1623. In November 2006 a construction worker from Glasgow was arrested and confessed to theft by housebreaking having entered an unlocked house and stolen £60 in cash. Media interest was stirred when it was reported that this was the first recorded crime since 2004 and the "first ever theft from a house". The next reported crime was in 2013 involving vandalism to a car.

Colonsay may be the smallest island ever to host a rugby festival, all the more remarkable as there is no permanent rugby pitch.

Transport
Caledonian MacBrayne ferries sail to Oban and, between April and October, to Kennacraig via Port Askaig on Islay.

In 2006 the former grass airstrip was upgraded and provided with a hard surface in readiness for the introduction of a scheduled air service. Hebridean Air Services operates from Oban Airport and Islay Airport to Colonsay Airport.

The arts
The 1945 film I Know Where I'm Going! directed by Michael Powell and Emeric Pressburger was principally shot on Mull and references the fictional "Isle of Kiloran", which was based on Colonsay. The American author John McPhee, descended from a Colonsay emigrant, spent a summer on Colonsay, out of which was published The Crofter and the Laird in 1969.

In 2008, Colonsay hosted the first ever Ceòl Cholasa, the island's own folk festival. This has now become an annual event and has seen performances by numerous well-known artists including Phil Cunningham & Aly Bain, Karen Matheson, and Karine Polwart as well as performances from local island musicians.

Since 2011 the island has held a three-week "Festival of Spring" annually in May. Its aim is to encourage tourism onto the island, with events and activities led by both local inhabitants and visiting guest "speakers/experts".

A similar event occurs every autumn, called "Connect with Colonsay", which runs over a three-week period in October.

In 2012 the island staged its first annual book festival which featured, amongst others, Alexander McCall Smith, James Robertson, and Scots Makar Liz Lochhead. The line up for 2013 was headed by crime writer Ian Rankin.

Wildlife
The island is home to a herd of wild goats, and is known for its bird life including black-legged kittiwakes, cormorants, guillemots, corncrakes and golden eagles.

Colonsay and Oronsay are home to about 50 colonies of the European dark bee the Apis mellifera mellifera. The Scottish Government introduced the Bee Keeping (Colonsay and Oronsay) Order 2013 to prevent cross breeding with other honeybees (Apis mellifera)  and to protect it from diseases common on the mainland. From 1 January 2014 it has been an offence to keep any other honeybee on either island. The Environment and climate Change Minister Paul Wheelhouse MSP said: "The Bee Keeping Order illustrates how our non-native species legislation can be used to protect our native wildlife. The order is a targeted measure to protect an important population of black bees on Colonsay from hybridisation with non-native bees" (the "non-native species legislation" was used because Apis mellifera are considered to be non-native to Colonsay, but considered native to Scotland as it was the first honey bee to be introduced for use in beekeeping there). The bees on Colonsay are now referred to as the "Colonsay Dark Native Bee". They were collected from across Scotland in the previous thirty years, genetic analysis has shown Australian and New Zealand A. m. ligustica introgression.

Etymology
Colonsay's name derives from Old Norse and means "Kolbein's island" (although Haswell-Smith offers "Columba's island"). In the 14th century the name was recorded as Coluynsay and by Dean Monro in the 16th century as Colvansay. The modern Gaelic is Colbhasa. Scalasaig also has a Norse derivation and means "Skali's bay".

Climate
Colonsay has an oceanic climate (Köppen: Cfb).

Notable residents
 Donald MacKinnon was born in Kilchattan on Colonsay, in 1839. In 1882, he became the first person appointed to the Chair of Celtic Studies at Edinburgh University. Professor MacKinnon was born on Colonsay in 1839 and held the Celtic Chair from 1882 until his death at Balnahard, Colonsay, in 1914.
John McNeill, recipient of the Victoria Cross.
 Danny Alexander the ex-Liberal Democrat Member of Parliament for Inverness, Nairn, Badenoch and Strathspey grew up on Colonsay.

Gallery

See also

 Colonsay, Saskatchewan, a village in Canada that takes its name from the island.
 List of islands of Scotland
 List of lighthouses in Scotland
 List of Northern Lighthouse Board lighthouses

Notes

References
 
 
 
 Watson, W. J. (1994). The Celtic Place-Names of Scotland. Edinburgh; Birlinn. . First published 1926.

External links

 Island at the Edge Colonsay produce website
 Island web site
 The Corncrake, Colonsay's newsletter
 Colonsay Estate Website and Holiday Cottages

 
Clan MacNeil
Geological type localities of Scotland
Islands of the Inner Hebrides
Islands of Argyll and Bute